Kamil Rozmus (born 13 January 1994) is a Polish professional footballer who plays as a left-back for Motor Lublin.

References

1994 births
People from Szczebrzeszyn
People from Lublin Voivodeship
Living people
Polish footballers
Poland youth international footballers
Association football defenders
Wisła Płock players
Wigry Suwałki players
ŁKS Łódź players
Górnik Łęczna players
Motor Lublin players
Ekstraklasa players
I liga players
II liga players
III liga players